"En droppe regn" is a song written by Ingela "Pling" Forsman, Bobby Ljunggren and Henrik Wikström, and performed by Niclas Wahlgren at Melodifestivalen 2006, where it went further to Andra chansen before getting knocked out.

The song received a Svensktoppen test on 14 May 2006, but failed to chart.

Charts

References

2006 singles
2006 songs
Melodifestivalen songs of 2006
Swedish-language songs
Songs with lyrics by Ingela Forsman
Songs written by Henrik Wikström
Songs written by Bobby Ljunggren